Daniel Jonathan Stevens (born 10 October 1982) is a British actor and writer. He first drew international attention for his role as Matthew Crawley in the ITV acclaimed period drama series Downton Abbey (2010–2012). He also starred as David in the thriller film The Guest (2014), Sir Lancelot in the adventure film Night at the Museum: Secret of the Tomb (2014), The Beast/Prince in Disney's live action adaptation of Beauty and the Beast (2017), Lorin Willis in the biographical legal drama Marshall (2017), Charles Dickens in the biographical drama The Man Who Invented Christmas (2017) and Russian Eurovision singer Alexander Lemtov in Eurovision Song Contest: The Story of Fire Saga (2020). From 2017 to 2019, he starred as David Haller in the FX series Legion. In 2018, he starred in the Netflix horror-thriller Apostle.

Early life
Stevens was adopted at birth by parents who were both teachers, and grew up in Wales and southeast England. He has a biological younger brother, Jason Andrew Stevens (b. 1984), who was adopted by different parents.  Stevens boarded on a scholarship at Tonbridge School, a private school in Kent. There he became interested in drama after auditioning for the title role in Macbeth with his teacher, novelist Jonathan Smith. From the age of 15, he spent his summers training and performing with the National Youth Theatre in London.

Stevens studied English Literature at Emmanuel College, Cambridge. While at Cambridge, he was a member of the Footlights with Stefan Golaszewski, Tim Key and Mark Watson, and was also active in the Marlowe Society. He was first spotted by director Peter Hall at a Marlowe Society production of Macbeth, in which he played the title character alongside Hall's daughter, Rebecca Hall.

Career 
In 2004, Stevens began his professional acting career when Peter Hall cast him as Orlando in his touring production of Shakespeare's As You Like It. The tour took the production to the Rose Theatre in Kingston upon Thames, the Brooklyn Academy of Music in New York City, the Curran Theatre in San Francisco, and the Ahmanson Theatre in Los Angeles. His debut performance earned him glowing reviews from prominent critics in Britain and the United States, as well as a commendation at the 2004 Ian Charleson Awards.

In 2006, Stevens starred as Nick Guest in the BBC adaptation of Alan Hollinghurst's Man Booker Prize-winning novel The Line of Beauty. Later that year, he played Simon Bliss in Hay Fever by Noël Coward at London's Haymarket Theatre, alongside Peter Bowles and Dame Judi Dench; the director was Peter Hall. He also performed as Lord Holmwood in an adaptation of Dracula for the BBC, and as Basil Brookes in the BBC Emmy Award-winning film, Maxwell. That same year, he was named one of Screen International's 2006 Stars Of Tomorrow.

In 2008, Stevens appeared in the BBC adaptation of Jane Austen's novel, Sense & Sensibility, playing Edward Ferrars, and the West End revival of Noël Coward's The Vortex. In January 2009, he appeared on New Year's Day in Agatha Christie's Marple: Nemesis on ITV1 in Britain. He also appeared in an adaptation of The Turn of the Screw featuring future Downton Abbey costar Michelle Dockery. In June 2009, he returned to the West End, playing Septimus Hodge in an acclaimed revival of Tom Stoppard's Arcadia at the Duke of York's Theatre.

In 2010, Stevens got his biggest break when he was cast as Matthew Crawley in the ITV series Downton Abbey, created and written by Oscar-winning screenwriter Julian Fellowes. The series went on to be a global sensation and has been nominated for several Emmy, BAFTA, Golden Globe and Screen Actors Guild Awards since its debut. The central love story of Matthew Crawley and his distant cousin, Lady Mary Crawley, played by Michelle Dockery, was enormously popular. Determined to move on with his career, Stevens chose to leave the series after finishing the third season and the Christmas Special in 2012. His exit caused a huge uproar with fans, who notably took to Twitter and other social media sites to express their anger at the character's death. Fellowes later explained that Stevens did not give sufficient notice for a less drastic departure.

In November 2011, Stevens guest-hosted an episode of Have I Got News for You. In March 2012, he completed shooting Vamps, the latest film from Amy Heckerling, and Summer in February, an Edwardian romance film set in an artist colony. Also in 2012, Stevens moved with his family to New York City, when he made his Broadway debut that year opposite Jessica Chastain and David Strathairn in The Heiress.

In 2014, Stevens starred in the independent film The Guest, winning critical acclaim for his portrayal of a recently discharged army veteran who goes on a killing spree to protect his true identity. He earned a Saturn Award for Best Actor nomination for his performance. Also in 2014, he appeared in the magic realism comedy-drama film The Cobbler, and in the dark action film A Walk Among the Tombstones. He played a simulacrum of Sir Lancelot in the 2014 comedy film Night at the Museum: Secret of the Tomb.

In February 2016, Stevens was cast in the lead role of David Charles Haller in the FX series Legion, an X-Men-related drama created by Noah Hawley. The first season began airing in February 2017 and received critical acclaim; a second season aired the next year, and was renewed for a third season in June 2018.

In 2017, Stevens lent his voice as the Beast, opposite Emma Watson as Belle, in Disney's live-action adaptation of Beauty and the Beast, directed by Bill Condon. The film was released in March 2017 to positive reviews, and earned over $1.2 billion in worldwide box office revenue, making it the highest-grossing live-action musical film, the second highest-grossing film of 2017, and the 17th highest-grossing film of all time. At the same year, he appeared in Marshall with Chadwick Boseman, Josh Gad and Kate Hudson, and The Man Who Invented Christmas, directed by Bharat Nalluri, and co-starring Christopher Plummer and Jonathan Pryce.

In 2018, Stevens starred in the Netflix thriller film Apostle, directed by Gareth Huw Evans. In 2019, Stevens co-starred in the drama Lucy in the Sky, released in September 2019. It co-stars Natalie Portman and Jon Hamm, and is directed by Legion creator, Noah Hawley.

In 2020, Stevens co-starred alongside Harrison Ford in The Call of the Wild, released on 21 February 2020. The film is based on the American classic novel by Jack London. He also returned to Broadway to star in Martin McDonagh's dark comedy Hangmen. The Atlantic Theater Company production co-starred Mark Addy and Ewen Bremner. Stevens played the pivotal role of Mooney. The production was to have a 20-week limited engagement at the Golden Theatre in Manhattan. Previews began on 29 February, however the production's run was suspended on 11 March, before it had officially opened, due to the COVID-19 pandemic. On 20 March the producers announced with regret that the production was closed permanently. All Broadway theatres were shut down soon afterwards. The same year, he appears as an "absurdly lascivious" Russian crooner in the Netflix musical comedy film Eurovision Song Contest: The Story of Fire Saga, co-starring with Will Ferrell and Rachel McAdams.

In 2021, Stevens played a robot in the German language sci-fi romance I'm Your Man.

Other work 
Stevens has narrated over 30 audiobooks, including Casino Royale, Wolf Hall and War Horse. In 2014, he was nominated for two Audie Awards, in the Classic category and Solo Narration (Male) category for Frankenstein.

Outside acting, Stevens maintains an interest in writing and literature and is editor-at-large for The Junket, an online quarterly that he co-founded in 2011 with some friends. He was a member of the judging panel for the 2012 Man Booker Prize, and was a regular columnist for the Sunday Telegraph.

A cricket enthusiast, he played for the Authors XI team, which is composed of a number of prominent British writers, in 2012. He also contributed a chapter to the team's book The Authors XI: A Season of English Cricket from Hackney to Hambledon, which was shortlisted for the 2014 Cricket Society and M.C.C. Book of the Year Award.

Personal life 
In 2009, Stevens married South African jazz singer and singing teacher Susie Hariet. They have three children. He is fluent in French and German.

Filmography

Film

Television

Other works

Stage

Audiobook narrator

Radio and audio drama

Podcasts

References

External links 

 
 

1982 births
Living people
21st-century English male actors
Alumni of Emmanuel College, Cambridge
English adoptees
English male film actors
English male Shakespearean actors
English male stage actors
English male television actors
English male voice actors
Male actors from Kent
Male actors from London
National Youth Theatre members
People educated at Tonbridge School
People from Croydon
Audiobook narrators